Face2face is a proprietary proximity-based mobile application developed by Proximate Global Inc. It allows users to privately identify when members of their social networks are within close proximity.

Face2face was launched in July 2010 for smartphones including the iPhone, BlackBerry, Android, and many J2ME-compatible devices. Face2face does not reveal precise location coordinates, although its technology gathers that data.

The app was downloaded 10,000 times within its first month of launch.

Privacy and security
Face2face compiles data from existing online social and business networks, including Facebook,  LinkedIn, MySpace, and Twitter.

Responding to growing concerns about location-based apps revealing too much information about a user's whereabouts, face2face incorporates "reciprocal sharing functionality" so that only users who make themselves known to each other are sharing their location data.

Awards
Face2face earned Mashable's "Spark of Genius" award in July 2010.

References

External links
Official site

Android (operating system) software
Geosocial networking
IOS software
BlackBerry software
Mobile social software